La virgen de la calle is a telenovela premiered on Venezuelan broadcast channel Televen on March 3, 2014, and concluded on August 29, 2014, based on the Venezuelan drama produced by Radio Caracas Televisión, entitled Juana la virgen. Recorded in RCTV studios, the show is created Perla Farías and produced by RTI Producciones along with Televisa.

It stars María Gabriela de Faría as Juana Pérez — A young high school student who becomes pregnant by mistake and unknowingly, along with Juan Pablo Llano as Mauricio Vega, Caridad Canelón as Azucena Pérez, Marjorie Magri as Desirée Rojas and Rosanna Zanetti as Carlota Rivas.

Plot 
Mauricio Vega, director of the magazine , is desperate for a son and heir, and he and his wife decide to use the services of a surrogate mother. Unfortunately, in the hospital the name of the surrogate is confused with that of Juana, a young student. Juana is artificially inseminated with Mauricio's semen. Juana starts work at "La verdad" and the two fall in love.

Cast 
 María Gabriela de Faría as Juana Pérez
 Juan Pablo Llano as Mauricio Vega
 Eileen Abad as Ana María Pérez
 Dylan Abreu as Juanito
 Yuliana Addaf as Teresa
 Daniel Alvarado as Ernesto Molina
 Gioia Arismendi as Enriqueta Márquez
 Paula Bevilacqua as Lola
 César Román Bolívar as Piraña
 Luz Adriana Bustamante as Inés
 Armando Cabrera as Arsenio
 Caridad Canelón as Azucena Pérez
 Ángel Casallas as Gabriel
 Arán de las Casas as Willy 
 Laura Chimaras as Jessica
 Silvana Continanza as Petra
 Gonzalo Cubero as Castillo
 Fernando da Silva as Charly
 Jhon De Agrela as Torres
 Miguel de León as Rogelio Rivas
 Diana Díaz as Rosa Andrade
 Stephanie Cardone Fulop as  Susana 
 Juan Carlos García as Alfredo Rivas
 Jerónimo Gil as Salvador
 Christian McGaffney as David Uzcategui
 Hector Mercado as Pedrito'
 Alexander Solórzano as Carlos
 Rosanna Zanetti as Carlota Rivas
 Julie Restifo as Lucía de Rivas
 Nacho Huett as Humberto Rivas

References

Venezuelan telenovelas
RTI Producciones telenovelas
Pregnancy-themed television shows
2014 telenovelas
Colombian telenovelas
Mexican telenovelas
Televisa telenovelas
RCTV telenovelas
Televen telenovelas
2014 Venezuelan television series debuts
2014 Venezuelan television series endings
Spanish-language telenovelas
Television shows set in Venezuela
Mexican television series based on Venezuelan television series